"The Farmer in the Dell" is a singing game, nursery rhyme, and children's song. It probably originated in Germany and was brought to America by immigrants. From there, it spread to many other nations and is popular in a number of languages. It is Roud Folk Song Index number 6306.

Lyrics
Lyrics vary even within the same country. The following is a common version in the United States:

One UK variant has "The nurse takes a dog"; it ends by clapping [patting] the dog.

Origin and dissemination
The rhyme was first recorded in Germany in 1826, as "Es fuhr ein Bau'r ins Holz". It was more clearly a courtship game, with a farmer choosing a wife, then selecting a child, maid, and serving man who leaves the maid after kissing her. This was probably taken to America by German immigrants, where it next surfaced in New York City in 1883, in its modern form and using a melody similar to "A-Hunting We Will Go". From there, it seems to have been adopted throughout the United States, Canada (noted from 1893), the Netherlands (1894), and Great Britain; it is first found in Scotland in 1898 and England from 1909. In the early twentieth century, it was evident in France ("Le fermier dans son pré"), Sweden ("En bonde i vår by"), Australia, and South Africa.

Variations
Like most children's songs, there are geographic variations. In the United Kingdom, the first line is frequently changed to "The Farmer's in his den".  The rhyme progresses through the farmer being in the dell or his den, his desire for a wife, hers for a child, its for a nurse, a dog, then a bone, and ending in: "we all pat the bone". Every player then pats the one picked as the bone. The "Hi-Ho, the derry-o" lyric is variously replaced with, "Ee-i, tiddly-i", in London, "Ee-i, adio", "Ee-i, andio,", "Ee-i, en-gee-oh" or "Ee-i, entio", in Northern England, and "Ee-i, ee-i", in the West Country.

The Romanian language version is "Țăranul e pe câmp" ("The farmer is on the field"), but the "Hey-o" is replaced with "Ura, drăguţa mea" ("Hooray, my sweetheart"), and the last verses are: "the child has a nurse, the nurse has a cat, the cat catches a mouse, the mouse eats a cheese, the cheese is in a cask, the cask is in the garbage, the farmer to choose."

Game
The players form a circle, holding hands while singing the first verse and moving around the player in the middle, who is designated as the farmer. When the verse is over they stop, and the farmer makes his choice of a wife (sometimes without looking). The wife joins him in the center for her verse, and this pattern is repeated through the verses until either the cheese or dog is selected, or only one person is left to become the last character, who usually becomes the farmer for the next round.

See also
"A-Hunting We Will Go"
Omar Little

References

German children's songs
German folk songs
Traditional children's songs
Singing games
Songs about farmers
German nursery rhymes
1820 songs
Songwriter unknown